The Stendorfer See is a lake west of Kasseedorf in Holstein Switzerland, Schleswig-Holstein, Germany.

The lake lies east of the Stendorf Manor House in the parish of Kasseedorf and is surrounded by a rolling moraine landscape.

The lake is oblong in shape with a maximum length of about 1,500 metres and a maximum width of about 700 metres.

The Stendorfer See is crossed by the River Schwentine from east to west. In addition several smaller lakes and ponds drain into it - including the Kolksee to the southwest and the Oberteich.

It is used as a fishing lake. In addition to pike, eel, perch, tench and stocked carp, burbot may also be caught occasionally.

Sources 
 Stendorfer See at www.umweltdaten.landsh.de 

Lakes of Schleswig-Holstein